The 1990 NCAA Division I women's soccer tournament was the ninth annual single-elimination tournament to determine the national champion of NCAA Division I women's collegiate soccer. The championship game was played at Fetzer Field in Chapel Hill, North Carolina during December 1990.

North Carolina defeated Connecticut Huskies in the final, 6–0, to win their eighth national title. Coached by Anson Dorrance, the Tar Heels finished the season undefeated, 24–0. This would go on to become the fifth of North Carolina's record nine consecutive national titles (1986–1994). It was also part of the Tar Heels' ten-year unbeaten streak that ran from the 1984 championship game all the way until the 1994 season.

The most outstanding offensive player was again Kristine Lilly from North Carolina, and the most outstanding defensive player was Stacey Blazo, also from North Carolina. Lilly was also the tournament's leading scorer (4 goals, 2 assists).

Qualification

All Division I women's soccer programs were eligible to qualify for the tournament. The tournament field remained fixed at 12 teams.

Bracket

See also 
 NCAA Division I women's soccer championship
 NCAA Division II Women's Soccer Championship
 NCAA Division III Women's Soccer Championship
 1990 NCAA Division I Men's Soccer Championship

References

NCAA
NCAA Women's Soccer Championship
 
NCAA Division I Women's Soccer Tournament
NCAA Division I Women's Soccer Tournament
Women's sports in North Carolina